Sir David Robinson (13 April 1904 – 10 January 1987) was a British entrepreneur and philanthropist.  

He donated £18 million to the University of Cambridge to establish a new college in his name.  Robinson College, Cambridge, the newest in the university, was formally opened in 1981.  

Robinson also donated £3 million to start the Rosie Hospital, named after his mother, which is now a part of Addenbrooke's Hospital in Cambridge.

Robinson was born in Cambridge, England, the third of six sons and third of nine children of Herbert ​Robinson, cycle shop and later garage owner, and his wife, Rosie Emily Tricker. 

He was educated at the  Cambridge and County High School for Boys, which according to the  Cambridge Evening News "had been started in 1900 to meet the requirements of boys who are likely to follow industrial and commercial pursuits" and which he left at the age of fifteen in order to work in his father's bicycle shop in Cambridge. 

In 1930 he moved to Bedford, where he took over a garage and developed it into a large and prosperous firm. In the late 1930s, he built a business renting radios and televisions, which was commercially successful.

Robinson was also involved with horse-racing: in the late 1960s and 1970s he owned a large number of winning horses which also yielded significant profits. His racing stables, Clarehaven, was one of the biggest racing stables in England.  His string of 120–150 horses was split between two trainers, Michael Jarvis  and Paul Davey.

He was knighted in 1985, and died two years later in Newmarket, the centre of English horse-racing.

References

External links 
 Biography of Sir David Robinson from the Robinson College website

1904 births
1987 deaths
20th-century British businesspeople
British racehorse owners and breeders
Knights Bachelor
Freemasons of the United Grand Lodge of England
20th-century British philanthropists